Rechitsa is a rural locality (a settlement) and the administrative center of Rechitskoye Rural Settlement, Pochepsky District, Bryansk Oblast, Russia. The population was 2,227 as of 2010. There are 22 streets.

Geography 
Rechitsa is located 6 km south of Pochep (the district's administrative centre) by road. Pochep is the nearest rural locality.

References 

Rural localities in Pochepsky District